The 2016–17 Utah Jazz season was the 43rd season of the franchise in the National Basketball Association (NBA), and the 38th season of the franchise in Salt Lake City. They qualified for the playoffs for the first time since 2012.

The Jazz finished the regular season with a 51–31 record, securing the 5th seed. In the playoffs, the Jazz defeated the Los Angeles Clippers in the First Round in seven games and advanced to the Western Conference Semifinals, where they were swept in four games by the eventual champion Golden State Warriors.

Following the season, Gordon Hayward would sign as a free agent with the Boston Celtics. He was also selected to play in the 2017 NBA All-Star Game.

Draft picks

Roster

Standings

Division

Conference

Game log

Pre-season

|- style="background:#fcc;"
| 1 || October 3 || @ Portland
| 
| Gordon Hayward (17)
| Rudy Gobert (13)
| Shelvin Mack (4)
| Moda Center15,004
| 0–1
|- style="background:#bfb;"
| 2 || October 5 || @ Phoenix
| 
| Rudy Gobert (21)
| Rudy Gobert (10)
| Hill, Mack (5)
| Talking Stick Resort Arena8,407
| 1–1
|- style="background:#bfb;"
| 3 || October 10 || @ L.A. Clippers
| 
| Rodney Hood (17)
| George Hill, Trey Lyles (8)
| George Hill (4)
| Staples Center12,518
| 2–1
|- style="background:#fcc;"
| 4 || October 12 || Phoenix
| 
| Dante Exum (18)
| Rudy Gobert (8)
| Shelvin Mack (4)
| Vivint Smart Home Arena16,521
| 2–2
|- style="background:#bfb;"
| 5 || October 17 || L.A. Clippers
| 
| Rudy Gobert (17)
| Rudy Gobert (10)
| Dante Exum (6)
| Vivint Smart Home Arena18,811
| 3–2
|- style="background:#fcc;"
| 6 || October 19 || Portland
| 
| George Hill (16)
| Trey Lyles (8)
| Boris Diaw (4)
| Vivint Smart Home Arena17,519
| 3–3

Regular season

|- style="background:#fcc"
| 1
| October 25
| @ Portland
| 
| Joe Johnson (29)
| Rudy Gobert (14)
| George Hill (6)
| Moda Center  19,446
| 0–1
|- style="background:#cfc"
| 2
| October 28
| L.A. Lakers
| 
| George Hill (23)
| Rudy Gobert (13)
| George Hill (3)
| Vivint Smart Home Arena19,911
| 1–1
|- style="background:#fcc"
| 3
| October 30
| @ L.A. Clippers
| 
| George Hill (18)
| Derrick Favors (11)
| Gobert, Johnson, Hill, Ingles (3)
| Staples Center19,060
| 1–2

|- style="background:#cfc"
| 4
| November 1
| @ San Antonio
| 
| George Hill (22)
| Rudy Gobert (12)
| George Hill (7)
| AT&T Center18,418
| 2–2
|- style="background:#cfc"
| 5
| November 2
| Dallas
| 
| George Hill (25)
| Rudy Gobert (12)
| George Hill (4)
| Vivint Smart Home Arena19,318
| 3–2
|- style="background:#fcc"
| 6
| November 4
| San Antonio
| 
| Rodney Hood (18)
| Rudy Gobert (8)
| George Hill (4)
| Vivint Smart Home Arena19,911
| 3–3
|- style="background:#cfc"
| 7
| November 6
| @ New York
| 
| Gordon Hayward (28)
| Rudy Gobert (8)
| George Hill (9)
| Madison Square Garden19,812
| 4–3
|- style="background:#cfc
| 8
| November 7
| @ Philadelphia
| 
| Gordon Hayward (20)
| Derrick Favors (9)
| Hayward, Mack (5)
| Wells Fargo Center14,168
| 5–3
|-style="background:#fcc
| 9
| November 9
| @ Charlotte
| 
| Gordon Hayward (29)
| Rudy Gobert (11)
| Shelvin Mack (5)
| Spectrum Center15,712
| 5–4
|-style="background:#cfc
| 10
| November 11
| @ Orlando
| 
| Gordon Hayward (20)
| Rudy Gobert (13)
| Gordon Hayward (8)
| Amway Center18,846
| 6–4
|-style="background:#cfc
| 11
| November 12
| @ Miami
| 
| Gordon Hayward (25)
| Rudy Gobert (12)
| Gordon Hayward (4)
| American Airlines Arena19,600
| 7–4
|-style="background:#fcc
| 12
| November 14
| Memphis
| 
| Joe Ingles (20)
| Lyles, Gobert (5)
| Shelvin Mack (4)
| Vivint Smart Home Arena18,176
| 7–5
|-style="background:#fcc
| 13
| November 17
| Chicago
| 
| Rudy Gobert (16)
| Rudy Gobert (13)
| Gordon Hayward (3)
| Vivint Smart Home Arena19,911
| 7–6
|-style="background:#fcc
| 14
| November 19
| @ Houston
| 
| Rodney Hood (25)
| Rudy Gobert (14)
| Shelvin Mack (7)
| Toyota Center14,760
| 7–7
|-style="background:#fcc
| 15
| November 20
| @ Denver
| 
| Gordon Hayward (25)
| Hayward, Gobert (7)
| Joe Ingles (4)
| Pepsi Center12,565
| 7–8
|-style="background:#cfc
| 16
| November 23
| Denver
| 
| Hayward, Hill (22)
| Rudy Gobert (13)
| Gordon Hayward (7)
| Vivint Smart Home Arena19,229
| 8–8
|-style="background:#cfc
| 17
| November 25
| Atlanta
| 
| Gordon Hayward (24)
| Gobert, Lyles (10)
| Shelvin Mack (5)
| Vivint Smart Home Arena19,911
| 9–8
|-style="background:#cfc
| 18
| November 28
| @ Minnesota
| 
| Hayward, Hill  (24)
| Rudy Gobert (17)
| Hood, Diaw (5)
| Target Center9,384
| 10–8
|-style="background:#cfc
| 19
| November 29
| Houston
| 
| Gordon Hayward (31)
| Rudy Gobert (14)
| Gordon Hayward (7)
| Vivint Smart Home Arena19,911
| 11–8

|-style="background:#fcc
| 20
| December 1
| Miami
| 
| Gordon Hayward (32)
| Rudy Gobert (12)
| Gordon Hayward (7)
| Vivint Smart Home Arena19,073
| 11–9
|- style="background:#cfc
| 21
| December 3
| Denver
| 
| Gordon Hayward (32)
| Rudy Gobert (11)
| Ingles, Mack, Diaw (4)
| Vivint Smart Home Arena19,911
| 12–9
|- style="background:#cfc
| 22
| December 5
| @ L. A. Lakers
| 
| Gordon Hayward (23)
| Rudy Gobert (17)
| Shelvin Mack (7)
| Staples Center18,279
| 13–9
|- style="background:#cfc
| 23
| December 6
| Phoenix
| 
| Gordon Hayward (28)
| Rudy Gobert (11)
| Boris Diaw (6)
| Vivint Smart Home Arena18,997
| 14–9
|- style="background:#fcc
| 24
| December 8
| Golden State
| 
| Joe Ingles (21)
| Rudy Gobert (17)
| Exum, Mack (5)
| Vivint Smart Home Arena19,911
| 14−10
|- style="background:#cfc
| 25
| December 10
| Sacramento
| 
| Gordon Hayward (24)
| Rudy Gobert (16)
| Shelvin Mack (5)
| Vivint Smart Home Arena19,331
| 15−10
|- style="background:#cfc
| 26
| December 14
| Oklahoma City
| 
| Rodney Hood (25)
| Rudy Gobert (12)
| Boris Diaw (6)
| Vivint Smart Home Arena19,911
| 16−10
|- style="background:#cfc
| 27
| December 16
| Dallas
| 
| Rudy Gobert (16)
| Rudy Gobert (10)
| Gordon Hayward (4)
| Vivint Smart Home Arena18,721
| 17−10
|- style="background:#cfc
| 28
| December 18
| @ Memphis
| 
| Gordon Hayward (22)
| Rudy Gobert (12)
| Gordon Hayward (6)
| FedExForum15,862
| 18–10
|- style="background:#fcc
| 29
| December 20
| @ Golden State
| 
| Joe Johnson (14)
| Rudy Gobert (16)
| Joe Ingles (3)
| Oracle Arena19,596
| 18−11
|- style="background:#fcc
| 30
| December 21
| Sacramento
| 
| Gordon Hayward (28)
| Rudy Gobert (14)
| Boris Diaw (8)
| Vivint Smart Home Arena19,195
| 18−12
|- style="background:#fcc
| 31
| December 23
| Toronto
| 
| Gordon Hayward (23)
| Rudy Gobert (14)
| Joe Ingles (7)
| Vivint Smart Home Arena19,911
| 18–13
|- style="background:#cfc
| 32
| December 27
| @ L. A. Lakers
| 
| Gordon Hayward (31)
| Rudy Gobert (11)
| Hayward, Mack, Neto (3)
| Staples Center18,997
| 19–13
|- style="background:#cfc
| 33
| December 29
| Philadelphia
| 
| George Hill (21)
| Rudy Gobert (13)
| George Hill (6)
| Vivint Smart Home Arena19,911
| 20–13
|- style="background:#cfc
| 34
| December 31
| Phoenix
| 
| Hayward, Gobert (18)
| Rudy Gobert (13)
| Gordon Hayward (4)
| Vivint Smart Home Arena19,911
| 21–13

|- style="background:#cfc"
| 35
| January 2
| @ Brooklyn
| 
| Gordon Hayward (30)
| Rudy Gobert (16)
| Gordon Hayward (3)
| Barclays Center15,644
| 22–13
|- style="background:#fcc"
| 36
| January 3
| @ Boston
| 
| Gordon Hayward (23)
| Rudy Gobert (13)
| Derrick Favors (7)
| TD Garden18,624
| 22–14
|- style="background:#fcc"
| 37
| January 5
| @ Toronto
| 
| Shelvin Mack (17)
| Rudy Gobert (16)
| Mack, Ingles (3)
| Air Canada Centre19,800
| 22–15
|- style="background:#cfc"
| 38
| January 7
| @ Minnesota
| 
| George Hill (19)
| Rudy Gobert (15)
| George Hill (7)
| Target Center13,945
| 23–15
|- style="background:#fcc"
| 39
| January 8
| @ Memphis
| 
| Gordon Hayward (22)
| Rudy Gobert (13)
| six players (2)
| FedExForum16,112
| 23−16
|- style= "background:#cfc"
| 40
| January 10
| Cleveland
| 
| Gordon Hayward (28)
| Rudy Gobert (14)
| George Hill (7)
| Vivint Smart Home Arena19,911
| 24–16
|- style= "background:#cfc"
| 41
| January 13
| Detroit
| 
| Rodney Hood (21)
| Rudy Gobert (11)
| Boris Diaw (5)
| Vivint Smart Home Arena19,911
| 25–16
|- style="background:#cfc;"
| 42
| January 14
| Orlando
| 
| Gordon Hayward (23)
| Rudy Gobert (19)
| Hayward, Hill (7)
| Vivint Smart Home Arena19,911
| 26–16
|- style="background:#cfc;"
| 43
| January 16
| @ Phoenix
| 
| Rudy Gobert (18)
| Rudy Gobert (17)
| Hayward, Ingles (5)
| Talking Stick Resort Arena16,767
| 27–16
|- style="background:#cfc;"
| 44
| January 20
| @ Dallas
| 
| Gordon Hayward (26)
| Rudy Gobert (27)
| Hayward, Ingles (4)
| American Airlines Center19,421
| 28–16
|- style="background:#cfc;"
| 45
| January 21
| Indiana
| 
| George Hill (30)
| Rudy Gobert (27)
| Joe Ingles (6)
| Vivint Smart Home Arena19,911
| 29–16
|- style="background:#fcc;"
| 46
| January 23
| Oklahoma City
| 
| Gordon Hayward (17)
| Rudy Gobert (10)
| Boris Diaw (5)
| Vivint Smart Home Arena19,911
| 29–17
|- style="background:#fcc;"
| 47
| January 24
| @ Denver
| 
| Derrick Favors (18)
| Rudy Gobert (9)
| George Hill (5)
| Pepsi Center10,867
| 29–18
|- style="background:#cfc;"
| 48
| January 26
| L. A. Lakers
| 
| Gordon Hayward (24)
| Rudy Gobert (13)
| Favors, Hill (3)
| Vivint Smart Home Arena19,911
| 30–18
|- style="background:#fcc;"
| 49
| January 28
| Memphis
| 
| Rodney Hood (20)
| Rudy Gobert (9)
| Hayward,  Hill (5)
| Vivint Smart Home Arena19,911
| 30–19

|- style="background:#cfc;"
| 50
| February 1
| Milwaukee
| 
| Gordon Hayward (27)
| Rudy Gobert (15)
| Hayward, Ingles, Johnson (5)
| Vivint Smart Home Arena19,694
| 31–19
|- style="background:#cfc;"
| 51
| February 4
| Charlotte
| 
| Gordon Hayward (33)
| Rudy Gobert (15)
| Joe Johnson (4)
| Vivint Smart Home Arena19,911
| 32–19
|- style="background:#cfc;"
| 52
| February 6
| @ Atlanta
| 
| Gordon Hayward (30)
| Derrick Favors (10)
| George Hill (8)
| Philips Arena13,126
| 33–19
|- style="background:#cfc;"
| 53
| February 8
| @ New Orleans
| 
| George Hill (19)
| Rudy Gobert (16)
| Dante Exum (5)
| Smoothie King Center14,508
| 34–19
|- style="background:#fcc;"
| 54
| February 9
| @ Dallas
| 
| Gordon Hayward (36)
| Rudy Gobert (15)
| Shelvin Mack (7)
| American Airlines Center19,883
| 34–20
|- style="background:#fcc;"
| 55
| February 11
| Boston
| 
| Gordon Hayward (41)
| Rudy Gobert (14)
| Hill, Hayward (4)
| Vivint Smart Home Arena19,911
| 34–21
|- style="background:#fcc;"
| 56
| February 13
| L.A. Clippers
| 
| Derrick Favors (13)
| Rudy Gobert (14)
| Boris Diaw (4)
| Vivint Smart Home Arena19,521
| 34–22
|- style="background:#cfc;"
| 57
| February 15
| Portland
| 
| Gordon Hayward (22)
| Rudy Gobert (12)
| Gordon Hayward (7)
| Vivint Smart Home Arena19,590
| 35–22
|- style="background:#cfc;"
| 58
| February 24
| @ Milwaukee
| 
| Gordon Hayward (29)
| Rudy Gobert (16)
| Joe Ingles (5)
| Bradley Center 16,064
| 36–22
|- style="background:#cfc;"
| 59
| February 26
| @ Washington
| 
| Gordon Hayward (30)
| Rudy Gobert (20)
| George Hill (6)
| Verizon Center19,648
| 37–22
|- style="background:#fcc;"
| 60
| February 28
| @ Oklahoma City
| 
| Gordon Hayward (19)
| Rudy Gobert (10)
| George Hill (8)
| Chesapeake Energy Arena 18,203
| 37–23

|- style="background:#fcc;"
| 61
| March 1
| Minnesota
| 
| Dante Exum (15)
| Derrick Favors (12)
| Exum, Hill, Johnson (3)
| Vivint Smart Home Arena19,590
| 37–24
|- style="background:#cfc;"
| 62
| March 3
| Brooklyn
| 
| George Hill (34)
| Derrick Favors (12)
| George Hill (7)
| Vivint Smart Home Arena19,911
| 38–24
|-style="background:#cfc;"
| 63
| March 5
| @ Sacramento
| 
| Rodney Hood (28)
| Rudy Gobert (24)
| George Hill (8)
| Golden 1 Center17,608
| 39–24
|-style="background:#cfc;"
| 64
| March 6
| New Orleans
| 
| Gordon Hayward (23)
| Rudy Gobert (15)
| Ingles, Diaw (5)
| Vivint Smart Home Arena19,649
| 40–24
|- style="background:#cfc;"
| 65
| March 8
| @ Houston
| 
| Hayward, Gobert (23)
| Rudy Gobert (10)
| Rudy Gobert (4)
| Toyota Center16,230
| 41–24
|- style="background:#fcc;"
| 66
| March 11
| @ Oklahoma City
| 
| Dante Exum (22)
| Alec Burks (7)
| Burks, Neto (2)
| Chesapeake Energy Arena 18,203
| 41–25
|- style="background:#cfc;"
| 67
| March 13
| L. A. Clippers
| 
| Gordon Hayward (27)
| Rudy Gobert (10)
| George Hill (6)
| Vivint Smart Home Arena 18,428
| 42–25
|- style="background:#cfc;"
| 68
| March 15
| @ Detroit
| 
| Gordon Hayward (26)
| Hayward, Gobert (9)
| Gordon Hayward (6)
| The Palace of Auburn Hills 14,033
| 43–25
|- style= "background:#fcc;"
| 69
| March 16
| @ Cleveland
| 
| Rudy Gobert (20)
| Rudy Gobert (19)
| Hayward, Ingles (4)
| Quicken Loans Arena 20,562
| 43–26
|-style="background:#fcc;"
| 70
| March 18
| @ Chicago
| 
| George Hill (18)
| Rudy Gobert (13)
| Joe Ingles (5)
| United Center21,953
| 43–27
|- style="background:#fcc;"
| 71
| March 20
| @ Indiana
| 
| Gordon Hayward (38)
| Rudy Gobert (14)
| George Hill (6)
| Bankers Life Fieldhouse15,458
| 43–28
|- style="background:#cfc;"
| 72
| March 22
| New York
| 
| Rudy Gobert (35)
| Rudy Gobert (13)
| George Hill (4)
| Vivint Smart Home Arena19,911
| 44–28
|- style="background:#fcc;"
| 73
| March 25
| @ L. A. Clippers
| 
| Rudy Gobert (26)
| Rudy Gobert (14)
| Boris Diaw (5)
| Staples Center19,060
| 44–29
|- style="background:#cfc;"
| 74
| March 27
| New Orleans
| 
| Gobert, Hood (20)
| Rudy Gobert (19)
| George Hill (5)
| Vivint Smart Home Arena18,924
| 45–29
|- style="background:#cfc;"
| 75
| March 29
| @ Sacramento
| 
| Gordon Hayward (20)
| Rudy Gobert (15)
| Joe Ingles (5)
| Golden 1 Center17,608
| 46–29
|- style="background:#cfc;"
| 76
| March 31
| Washington
| 
| Gordon Hayward (19)
| Rudy Gobert (10)
| Boris Diaw (5)
| Vivint Smart Home Arena19,911
| 47–29

|- style="background:#fcc;"
| 77
| April 2
| @ San Antonio
| 
| Diaw, Gobert (19)
| Rudy Gobert (14)
| Rudy Gobert (5)
| AT&T Center18,418
| 47–30
|- style="background:#cfc;"
| 78
| April 4
| Portland
| 
| Gordon Hayward (30)
| Rudy Gobert (11)
| Diaw, Mack (5)
| Vivint Smart Home Arena19,911
| 48–30
|- style="background:#cfc;"
| 79
| April 7
| Minnesota
| 
| Gordon Hayward (39)
| Shelvin Mack (6)
| Joe Ingles (8)
| Vivint Smart Home Arena19,911
| 49–30
|- style="background:#fcc;"
| 80
| April 8
| @ Portland
| 
| Gordon Hayward (21)
| Rudy Gobert (11)
| Gordon Hayward (4)
| Moda Center19,865
| 49–31
|- style="background:#cfc;"
| 81
| April 10
| @ Golden State
| 
| George Hill (20)
| Rudy Gobert (18)
| Joe Ingles (7)
| Oracle Arena19,596
| 50–31
|- style="background:#cfc;"
| 82
| April 12
| San Antonio
| 
| Gordon Hayward (14)
| Rudy Gobert (9)
| George Hill (5)
| Vivint Smart Home Arena19,911
| 51–31

Playoffs

|- style="background:#bfb;"
| 1
| April 15
| @ L.A. Clippers
| 
| Joe Johnson (21)
| Gordon Hayward (10)
| Boris Diaw (6)
| Staples Center19,060
| 1–0
|- style="background:#fbb;"
| 2
| April 18
| @ L.A. Clippers
| 
| Gordon Hayward (20)
| Favors, Hill (7)
| George Hill (4)
| Staples Center19,060
| 1–1
|- style="background:#fbb;"
| 3
| April 21
| L.A. Clippers
| 
| Gordon Hayward (40)
| Gordon Hayward (8)
| Joe Ingles (5)
| Vivint Smart Home Arena19,911
| 1–2
|- style="background:#bfb;"
| 4
| April 23
| L.A. Clippers
| 
| Joe Johnson (28)
| Rudy Gobert (13)
| Joe Ingles (11)
| Vivint Smart Home Arena19,911
| 2–2
|- style="background:#bfb;"
| 5
| April 25
| @ L.A. Clippers
| 
| Gordon Hayward (27)
| Rudy Gobert (11)
| George Hill (7)
| Staples Center19,060
| 3–2
|- style="background:#fbb;"
| 6
| April 28
| L.A. Clippers
| 
| Gordon Hayward (31)
| Rudy Gobert (9)
| Gordon Hayward (4)
| Vivint Smart Home Arena19,911
| 3–3
|- style="background:#bfb;"
| 7
| April 30
| @ L.A. Clippers
| 
| Gordon Hayward (26)
| Derrick Favors (11)
| Hill, Johnson (5)
| Staples Center19,060
| 4–3

|- style="background:#fbb;"
| 1
| May 2
| @ Golden State
| 
| Rudy Gobert (13)
| Rudy Gobert (13)
| Hayward, Ingles, Mack (5)
| Oracle Arena19,596
| 0–1
|- style="background:#fbb;"
| 2
| May 4
| @ Golden State
| 
| Gordon Hayward (33)
| Rudy Gobert (16)
| Hayward, Mack (4)
| Oracle Arena19,596
| 0–2
|- style="background:#fbb;"
| 3
| May 6
| Golden State
| 
| Gordon Hayward (29)
| Rudy Gobert (15)
| Gordon Hayward (6)
| Vivint Smart Home Arena19,911
| 0–3
|- style="background:#fbb;"
| 4
| May 8
| Golden State
| 
| Gordon Hayward (25)
| Rudy Gobert (13)
| Hayward, Ingles (3)
| Vivint Smart Home Arena19,911
| 0–4

Transactions

Trades

Free agency

Additions

Subtractions

References

2016-17
2016–17 NBA season by team
2016 in sports in Utah
2017 in sports in Utah